The Sleeping Voice is a 2011 Spanish drama film directed by Benito Zambrano based on the novel of the same name by Dulce Chacón. It stars Inma Cuesta, María León, Marc Clotet and Daniel Holguín.

Plot
Two sisters find themselves caught up in politics in the turmoil following the Spanish Civil War. The pregnant Hortensia is locked away in a crowded women's prison. Her younger sister Pepita moves from Andalusia to Madrid to be near her. In Madrid, she finds a job in a wealthy home with connections in the Francoist regime. Pepita meets young guerrilla fighter (maquis) Paulino and falls in love with him.

Cast

Production 
The film was produced by Maestranza Films alongside Mirada Sur, and it had support from the Spanish Ministry of Culture, the Junta de Andalucía, the Diputación de Huelva, TVE, Canal+ and Canal Sur. Antonio Pérez is credited as producer and Álex Catalán as cinematographer. Shooting locations included the Plaza Mayor in Madrid. Around a 40% of the footage was shot in the province of Huelva.

Release 
The film screened at the 59th San Sebastián International Film Festival (SSIFF). Distributed by Warner Bros Entertainment España, it was theatrically released on 21 October 2021. The Sleeping Voice made the shortlist of three candidates for the Spanish submission to the 84th Academy Awards together with The Skin I Live In and Black Bread, but the latter film became the final choice.

Accolades

|-
| align = "center" | 2011 || San Sebastián International Film Festival || Silver Shell for Best Actress || María León ||  || 
|-
| align = "center" rowspan = 15 | 2012 || rowspan = "2" | 17th Forqué Awards || colspan = "2" | Best Film ||  || rowspan = "2" | 
|-
| Best Actress || María León || 
|-
| rowspan = "9" | 26th Goya Awards || colspan = "2" | Best Film ||  || rowspan = "9" | 
|-
| Best Director || Benito Zambrano ||  
|-
| Best Adapted Screenplay || Benito Zambrano, Ignacio del Moral ||  
|-
| Best Original Song || "Nana de la hierbabuena" by  ||  
|-
| Best Actress || Inma Cuesta ||  
|-
| Best Supporting Actress || Ana Wagener ||  
|-
| Best New Actor || Marc Clotet ||  
|-
| Best New Actress || María León ||  
|-
| Best Costume Design || María José Iglesias García ||  
|-
| rowspan = "4" | 21st Actors and Actresses Union Awards || rowspan = "2" | Best Film Actress in a Leading Role || María León ||  || rowspan = "4" | 
|-
| Inma Cuesta || 
|-
| rowspan = "2" | Best Film Actress in a Secondary Role || Ana Wagener  || 
|-
| Charo Zapardiel || 
|}

See also 
 List of Spanish films of 2011

References

External links 

2011 drama films
Spanish drama films
Films set in Madrid
Films shot in the province of Huelva
Films shot in Madrid
Films based on Spanish novels
Films about the Spanish Maquis
Maestranza Films films
2010s Spanish films
2010s Spanish-language films